Roger Federer was the defending champion, but chose not to play that year. Albert Montañés won the title, notably by saving match points in quarterfinal and final match.

Seeds

Draw

Finals

Top half

Bottom half

External links
Draw
Qualifying Draw

2009 Estoril Open - Men's Singles
2009 ATP World Tour
2009 Estoril Open